Etihad Rail is the United Arab Emirates national railway network. It was established in June 2009 under Federal Law No. 2 to manage the development, construction and operation of the United Arab Emirates' national freight and passenger railway network. Etihad Rail aims to link the UAE's principal centres of industry and population, and to link these centres with other railways throughout the Gulf Cooperation Council.

Etihad Rail is being developed in line with the Abu Dhabi Economic Vision 2030 and the UAE Vision 2021, which in turn contributes to economic diversification through strategic initiatives set to bolster UAE socio-economic growth and diversification.

Commercial operations of Stage One commenced in January 2016 on time and within budget. The operator of Stage One is Etihad Rail DB, which is a joint venture between Etihad Rail and Deutsche Bahn, Europe's largest railway operator, which was set up in 2013.

Since the signing of finance agreements for Stage Two, Etihad Rail has finalised routes and reserved Etihad Rail's corridors and lands by signing agreements with the relevant authorities throughout the Emirates, awarded all of Stage Two packages and launched constructions work on these packages.

History 
In 2004, the six countries of the Gulf Cooperation Council commissioned a feasibility study regarding a railway network spanning the region. Etihad Rail was founded in June 2009 following the passage of Federal Law No. 2.

Stage One 
 long Stage One of Etihad Rail connecting the inland gas fields of Liwa and Shah to the port town of Ruwais, became operational in January 2016.

Stage Two 
The first track for Stage Two was laid in early 2021.

Network

Overview 
The network will use diesel traction, with the potential to electrify in the future.

The network will use standard gauge, mainly double track, be designed for mixed-use traffic, use a European signaling system (ETCS level 2), and have heavy haul 32.5 tonnes axle loads and the loading gauge on the track accommodates double stack containers.

Stage One: Shah – Habshan – Ruwais (operational) 
Etihad Rail completed Stage One of the network in January 2016, delivered on schedule and within budget. The route spans , transporting granulated sulphur from sources at Shah and Habshan to the processing and export point at Ruwais. It currently has the capacity to transport 22,000 tonnes of granulated sulphur each day.

The operator of Stage One is Etihad Rail DB, which is a joint venture between Etihad Rail and Deutsche Bahn, Europe's largest railway operator, which was set up in 2013. Etihad Rail DB is responsible for the operations and maintenance of Stage One of the railway network for Etihad Rail's primary customer, the Abu Dhabi National Oil Company.

Stage One utilises seven state-of-the-art locomotives from U.S.-based Electro-Motive Diesel, equipped with the ETCS Level 2 in-cab European signalling system and international standard safety features. In addition, it is operating with up to 110 wagons per run, fully equipped with extended safety features including ECPB brakes and derailment protection.

Stage Two: Ghuweifat – Fujairah (Under construction) 
Stage Two will extend  from Ghuwaifat on the border with Saudi Arabia to Fujairah on the east coast.

Stage Two PMC & Engineering Contracts were awarded in 2018 to Egis Group and Jacobs Engineering Group respectively, for development and supervision of the next phase from Ghuwaifat in the west to Fujairah on the east coast.

Contracts for the Design and Build of Package A were awarded to a joint venture between the China State Construction Engineering Corporation and South Korea's SK Engineering and Construction.

Packages B and C of the network, which connect Stage One to Abu Dhabi and Dubai, have been awarded to a joint venture between the China Railway Construction Corporation and the Ghantoot Transport & General Contracting Company.

The contract for Package D has been awarded to a joint venture of the China Railway Construction Corporation and National Projects and Construction, NPC. Package D includes the construction of 35 bridges to span road systems, valleys and wadis, 32 underpasses and 15 tunnels, totaling , through the Al Hajar Mountains using blast-tunneling technology.

A systems and integration contract has been awarded to Hitachi Rail STS for the supply of European Rail Traffic Management System technology and related equipment across the network. A freight facilities contract was awarded to a joint venture of Larsen & Toubro and Power China International, to construct freight facilities for the railway network. Under the terms of the contract, the two companies will be jointly responsible for the surveying, design, construction, equipment installation, testing and pre-commissioning of each facility. Etihad Rail is building a series of freight facilities in Ruwais, Industrial City of Abu Dhabi (ICAD), Khalifa Port, Dubai Industrial City, Jebel Ali Port, Al Ghayl & Fujairah Port capable of undertaking all loading and unloading operations, in addition to providing container storage and maintenance.

Progress Rail will design, manufacture, test, and ship 38 EMD locomotives specially designed to withstand the high temperatures and humidity of the gulf region. Additionally, the locomotives will be equipped with a state-of-the-art air filtration system that filters sand from the air intake and pulse cleaning systems, ensuring effective and efficient operations.

A contract for an operations and management facility in Al Faya has been awarded to a joint venture led by Vinci Construction France. The facility will be the largest facility for the network; it will be responsible for warehousing, installations, operations, and the maintenance of locomotives and wagons.

Impact

Geopolitical 
Etihad Rail aims to provide transportation links between the UAE and its Gulf Cooperation Council neighbors, and Stage Two of the railway is planned to connect to the border of Saudi Arabia. However, other Gulf Cooperation Council countries have lagged behind in rail, in large part due to complications arising from their failed adoption of the proposed Khaleeji currency, and due to the Qatar diplomatic crisis.

Political 
A senior fellow at the Middle East Institute suggested that the progress on the project has been stunted by a high degree of sovereignty maintained by the UAE's individual emirates. They suggested that this struggle reflected the relatively new concept of national centralization of political power.

Environmental 
According to Etihad Rail, one fully laden freight train trip on Stage One can replace approximately 300 trucks on the road, resulting in approximately 70-80% less  emissions than trucks moving the same tonnage. Rail transport lowers the cost of trade and improves the market position of existing industries, promoting their growth and leading to economic diversification through the creation of a new transport infrastructure and its related ecosystem.

Based on traffic volume forecasts, the Etihad Rail network will reduce greenhouse gases by more than 2.2 million tonnes annually: the equivalent of taking up to 375,000 vehicles off the roads.

The cost savings made by businesses that transfer their freight via rail will enable them to be more commercially successful and therefore contribute more to economic growth.

Estimated total benefits of emissions savings, accounting for truck freight and passengers moving from road to rail, is approximately AED24Bn over the next 50 years.

Social 
The railway will connect rural areas to cities, improving connectivity and generating wider economic benefits for these areas.

Etihad Rail projects the value of time saved for road users who will shift to the rail network, will amount to 10 billion Dirham over 40 years.

Etihad Rail also projects a reduction in rates of automotive accidents on the country's roads due to this shift to rail, estimating that the rail will result in 670 fewer crashes and 52 fewer deaths annually. They project that these impacts will amount to benefits totalling 20 billion Dirham over 40 years.

Economic 
Etihad Rail's website suggests that its railway will provide 186 billion Dirham in economic benefits over the course of 40 years, factoring in elements such as reduced transportation costs, as well as faster transportation times, lower emission impacts, and increased tourism generation.

Cargo, whether intermodal, bulk or break-bulk, can often be carried on rail at rates which are more competitive than other means of transport. Rail is part of the overall infrastructure development program in the UAE and will stimulate economic growth in the UAE and support the diversification of the economy.

The increase in land value of areas around rail stations will lead to revenue from leasing of potential residential, commercial and industrial developments, with a potential enhanced land value of AED23Bn over the next 50 years.

Etihad Rail estimates that its railway will generate an estimated 21 billion Dirham in tourism revenues over 40 years.

Etihad Rail also estimates that its railway will result in fewer trips via road, reducing the need for road maintenance, resulting in road maintenance costs being reduced by 7 billion Dirham over 40 years.

See also 
 Transport in the United Arab Emirates
 Rail transport in the United Arab Emirates
 Railway stations in the United Arab Emirates

References

External links
 Official website of Etihad Rail
 Official website of Etihad Rail DB

Etihad
Proposed transport infrastructure in the United Arab Emirates
Railway companies established in 2010